is an elevated railway station on the Tōkyū Tōyoko Line in Meguro, Tokyo, Japan, operated by the private railway operator Tokyu Corporation.

Lines
It is located 3.2 km from the terminus of the line at Shibuya.

Station layout
This station has two opposed side platforms serving two tracks, with an additional centre track introduced in March 2017 for use by non-stop trains. This local station can only accommodate eight-car length trains.

Platforms

History
Yutenji Station opened on 28 August 1927.

Remodelling work commenced in November 2013 to reduce the width of the platforms, enabling an additional centre track to be added between the existing up and down lines for use by non-stop trains. The newly-added centre track is scheduled to be brought into use from the start of the revised timetable on 25 March 2017.

Passenger statistics
In fiscal 2017, the station was used by an average of 31,494 passengers daily.

Surrounding area
 Meguro High School
 Yūtenji Temple
 Setagaya park

See also
 List of railway stations in Japan

References

External links

  
  

Railway stations in Japan opened in 1927
Tokyu Toyoko Line
Stations of Tokyu Corporation
Railway stations in Tokyo
Buildings and structures in Meguro